Dhonfanu (Dhivehi: ދޮންފަނު) is one of the inhabited islands of Baa Atoll in the Maldives.

Geography

Demography

References

Islands of the Maldives